Long Way Home is a 2018 Brazilian drama film directed by André Novais Oliveira. The film won five awards at the 51°. Brasília Film Festival, including Best Picture.

Cast 
Grace Passô...	Juliana
Russo Apr	...	Russão
Rejane Faria	...	Lúcia
Hélio Ricardo	...	Hélio
Juliana Abreu	...	Jaque
Renato Novaes	...	Jairo

Awards 
2018: AFI Fest
New Auteurs Audience Award (Nominee)

2018: Festival de Brasília
Best Film (won)
Best Actress (Grace Passô) (won)
Best Supporting Actor (Russo Apr) (won) 
Best Art Direction (Diogo Hayashi) (won) 
Best Cinematography (Wilssa Esser) (won)

References

External links 
 

2018 films
2010s Portuguese-language films
2018 drama films
Brazilian drama films